Xuming He (Chinese: 何旭铭) is a Professor of Statistics at the University of Michigan.

Biography
He earned a bachelor's degree in Applied Mathematics from Fudan University in 1984. He went to graduate school at University of Illinois at Urbana-Champaign in 1985 and received a Master's degree in Mathematics and then Ph.D. in Statistics in 1989. He joined the University of Michigan as H. C. Carver Collegiate Professor in 2011, and served as Department Chair from 2015 to 2020. His prior appointments include faculty positions at National University of Singapore and University of Illinois at Urbana-Champaign. His research interests include theory and methodology in robust statistics,  semiparametric models,  quantile regression, data depth,  dimension reduction, and subgroup analysis. His interdisciplinary research aims to promote the better use of statistics in biosciences, climate studies, dysphagia research, and social-economic studies.

Honors and awards
Xuming He is Fellow of the American Association for the Advancement of Science,  the American Statistical Association, the Institute of Mathematical Statistics, and an Elected Member of the International Statistical Institute. 
He held a Visiting  Chair Professorship of the Changjiang Scholars program, sponsored by the Chinese Ministry of Education and Li Ka Shing Foundation (2008).
He was IMS Medallion Lecturer and Keynote Speaker at the 2007 Joint Statistical Meetings, and Plenary Speaker at the 21st International Conference on Computational Statistics (COMPSTAT 2014). At the 62nd World Statistics Congress (2019) he delivered The International Association for Statistical Computing (IASC)'s President's Lecture.

In 2015, he received the Distinguished Achievement Award from the International Chinese Statistical Association. In 2021, he received the Founders Award from the American Statistical Association, the Distinguished Faculty Achievement Award from the University of Michigan, as well as a Rackham Distinguished Graduate Mentor Award. He received the Carver Medal (2022) from the Institute of the Mathematical Statistics for his decades-long contributions to the statistics profession.

Professional services
Elected Council member of the Institute of Mathematical Statistics (IMS) 2004–2006; 
President of the International Chinese Statistical Association (ICSA), 2010;
Elected Council member of the International Statistical Institute (ISI) 2013–2017;
Program Director of Statistics, National Science Foundation 2003–2005;
Program Chair, 2010 Joint Statistical Meetings;
Chair of the Scientific Program Committee, 2013 World Statistics Congress;
Editor of the IMS Bulletin (2007–2010);
Co-Editor of Journal of the American Statistical Association (2011–2014)
Editor of IMS Monographs/Textbooks (2017–2020) 
President-Elect of the International Statistical Institute (2021-2023)

References 

University of Michigan faculty
Living people
Year of birth missing (living people)
Fellows of the American Association for the Advancement of Science
Fellows of the American Statistical Association
Fellows of the Institute of Mathematical Statistics
Elected Members of the International Statistical Institute